Mykhailo Omelianovych-Pavlenko (8 December 1878 – 29 May 1952) was the Supreme Commander of the Ukrainian Galician Army (UHA) and of the Army of the Ukrainian People's Republic. Later, he served as defence minister for the Government-in-exile of the Ukrainian People's Republic.

Early life
Mykhaylo Omelianovych-Pavlenko was born in Tiflis (present-day Georgia). His father, Volodymyr, was an officer in the Russian Imperial Army. His mother was of a Georgian aristocratic family. Omelianovych-Pavlenko attended the military academy in Petersburg, graduating in 1900. He had a younger brother Ivan who later was fighting along with him.

Early military service
Pavlenko participated in the Russo-Japanese war as a company commander. Later, in 1910, he graduated from the General Staff School.

World War I
During World War I, Pavlenko served as commander of many units - including a Ukrainian brigade in Yekaterinoslav.

In the spring of 1917, Omelianovych-Pavlenko became an active supporter of Ukrainian independence, and initiated the creation of the Odessa batalion. He also initiated Ukrainian military academies in Zhytomyr and Kamyanets-Podilsky.

On December 10, 1918, Pavlenko assumed command of the Ukrainian Halitska Army, which he led until June 1919.

After the union of the UHA and the army of the Ukrainian People's Republic, Pavlenko assumed command of the force. He served as special attache to Symon Petlura. Omelianovych-Pavlenko commanded the army of the UNR during the First Winter Campaign (1920).

Inter-war Years
Pavlenko moved to Prague, where he headed the Alliance of Ukrainian Veterans' Organizations.

World War II
During the Second World War, after Nazi Germany invaded the Soviet Union, Pavlenko headed a Ukrainian nationalist militia, the Ukrainian Liberation Army, that allied itself with the Axis Powers.  At its peak it had 80,000 members.

After World War II

After World War II, Pavlenko moved to France, and became the Defence minister of the Government in exile of the Ukrainian National Republic from 1945 to 1948. Pavlenko was promoted to rank of Lieutenant General.

Legacy
Due to "decommunization policies" a street in (Ukraine's capital) Kyiv that was named after Imperial Russian General Alexander Suvorov was renamed after Omelianovych-Pavlenko in 2016.

Publications
Pavlenko authored four books: The Ukrainian-Polish War of 1918–19, (published in 1929), The Winter Campaign, (published in 1934), and two books of memoirs (published in 1930 and 1935).

References

1878 births
1952 deaths
Military personnel from Tbilisi
People from Tiflis Governorate
Generals of the Ukrainian People's Republic
Defence ministers of Ukraine
Ukrainian military leaders
Ukrainian Galician Army people
Russian military personnel of the Russo-Japanese War
Russian military personnel of World War I
Ukrainian people of World War I
Recipients of the Order of St. George
Recipients of the Order of St. Anna, 2nd class
Recipients of the Order of St. Anna, 3rd class
Recipients of the Order of St. Anna, 4th class
Burials at Père Lachaise Cemetery
Ukrainian collaborators with Nazi Germany